Afful is an Ashanti surname. Notable people with the Ashanti surname include:

Harrison Afful (born 1986), Ghanaian footballer
Les Afful (born 1984), English footballer
Joseph Afful (born 1979), Ghanaian-American soccer player
Afful is also Old High German for 'apple', as part of the High German consonant shift.

Surnames of Ashanti origin
Surnames of Akan origin